Adam Smith (born  in Digby, Nova Scotia) is a Canadian retired professional ice hockey defenceman. He was selected in the third round, 78th overall, by the New York Rangers in the 1994 NHL Entry Draft.

Playing career
Between 1996 and 1999 he played in the American Hockey League and the International Hockey League for Binghamton Rangers, Hartford Wolfpack, Grand Rapids Griffins and Fort Wayne Komets. He following that with three seasons in Europe playing for the Bracknell Bees and Sheffield Steelers of the Ice Hockey Superleague in the United Kingdom and for EC Bad Nauheim in the 2nd Bundesliga in Germany.

Smith returned to North America to finish the 2001–02 season playing for Trenton Titans and Macon Whoopee in the ECHL. He then returned to Europe for the 2002–03 season where he played four games for the Invicta Dynamos in the English Premier Ice Hockey League before moving back to the 2nd Bundesliga and playing for SC Riessersee.

While in the UK, Smith helped the Bracknell Bees to win the league championship in 1990–00 and the Sheffield Steelers to win a Grand Slam of the Challenge Cup, Benson & Hedges Cup, league championship and playoffs in the 2000–01 season.

Awards and honours
Named to the ISL All-Star Second Team in 2000–01.

Career statistics

References
Ice Hockey Journalists UK
The Internet Hockey Database

External links

1976 births
Binghamton Rangers players
Bracknell Bees players
Canadian ice hockey defencemen
Fort Wayne Komets players
Grand Rapids Griffins (IHL) players
Hartford Wolf Pack players
Kelowna Rockets players
Living people
Macon Whoopee (ECHL) players
New York Rangers draft picks
Sheffield Steelers players
Tacoma Rockets players
Trenton Titans players
People from Digby County, Nova Scotia
Canadian expatriate ice hockey players in England
20th-century Canadian people
21st-century Canadian people